Pachyphyllone is a diterpenoid of the abietane class found in the herb mountain desert sage (Salvia pachyphylla).

See also 
 List of phytochemicals in food

References 

Ketones
Salvia